Sahaswan is a city and a municipal board in Budaun district in the Indian state of western Uttar Pradesh. It is also an administrative Block, 0177 is the block code.

Demographics
According to 2011 Census of India the total area of the Sahaswan is 422.39 Square KM, total houses in the town are 36,026 and total population is 2,11,087 out of 1,13,625 are males and 97,462 are females.

Etymology 
The name Sahaswan is derived from the greatest emperor and the ruler of the entire globe who ruled the world from the kingdom of Mahishmati namely Rajrajeshwar Chakravarti Samrat Kartavirya Sahasrarjun Maharaj. The name, Sahaswan, actually derived from the name "Sahasrarjun"  from the whole name., The biggest achievement for Sahaswan is that it has the true gems of the music and a legendary musical Gharana is named after it. "The Rampur Sahaswan Gharana" and Sahaswan has produced many Hindustani musical legends who have brought glory to not only Sahaswan, Uttar Pradesh but India...

Notable people

Ghulam Mustafa Khan - singer who is the only Padmavi bhushan awardee from Budaun.
Ghulam Sadiq Khan - Padmashri Awardee
Inayat Hussain Khan 
Rashid Khan - Padmashri Awardee
Omkar Singh Yadav (b 1951), MLA for Sahaswan

References

Cities and towns in Budaun district
Blocks in Budaun District